Opher Etzion is an Israeli author and computer scientist. He has been instrumental in the development of the complex event processing area of computer science.

Professional background 
Etzion is the Chief Scientist of Event Processing at the IBM Haifa Research Lab. Previously, he was Lead Architect of Event Processing Technology at IBM Websphere and a Senior Manager at the IBM Research Division, managing a department that has pioneered projects shaping the field of event processing. He is also the founding chair of the Event Processing Technical Society.

Etzion serves as Professor and Academic Adviser to the MIS department of the Yezreel Valley College and Adjunct Professor at Technion – Israel Institute of Technology. Etzion has supervised several doctoral dissertations and masters theses.

He has authored or co-authored papers in technical journals and conferences on topics related to active databases, temporal databases, Rule-based systems, event processing and Autonomic computing.  He has given several keynote address and tutorials and has been named an ACM Distinguished Speaker.

With Peter Niblett, he was the co-author of Event Processing in Action, a comprehensive technical book about event processing.  He also co-edited the book Temporal Database - Research and Practice.

Prior to joining IBM in 1997, he was a faculty member and Founding Head of the Information Systems Engineering Department at Technion and held professional and managerial positions at Sapiens International Corporation and in the Israel Air Force.

Honors and awards 
 The Israeli Air Force Prize (the highest award for the Air Force), 1982
 IBM Outstanding Innovation Award, 2002 and 2013
 IBM Corporate Award, 2010
 ACM Distinguished Speaker, 2011

Published works

References

External links 
 Opher Etzion at Google Scholar

1957 births
Israeli computer scientists
Temple University alumni
Living people